Jusnaturalism or iusnaturalism is a theory of law, which holds that legal norms follow a human universal knowledge on justice and harmony of relations. Thus, it views enacted laws that contradict such universal knowledge as unjust and illegitimate. Modern theorists considered as iusnaturalists include Hugo Grotius, Immanuel Kant, Gottfried Wilhelm Leibniz, and Franz von Zeiller, among others.

This school of thought became popular during the Middle Ages and the Renaissance amid the attempt to identify "the relation, if any, of the ius gentium to natural law in the Aristotelian-Thomistic sense." This issue had covered the role of God and the adequacy of reason without divine grace, among others particularly in the field of legal theory as it established the notion that natural law could exist without religion.

Concept 
Iusnaturalism is associated with the notion of natural law proposed by Thomas Hobbes, John Locke, Baruch Spinoza, and Samuel von Pufendorf. It emerged from the view that emphasizes how the ideas of nature and divinity or reason are the sources of the validity of natural and positive laws. It is also linked to the general theory of law, which has been viewed as one that has positivist character, aiming to be objective and non-normative. For iusnaturalists, in order for a law to be accorded the status of legal or one that has a binding effect on people, it must be fair.  

Some scholars distinguish iusnaturalism from legal positivism but it is noted that both are concerned with the good law. Iusnaturalism subordinates power to law as well as positive law to higher laws, giving it a more meaningful primordial metanarrative of natural law. One of the fundamental notions of iusnaturalism is that man is free and no one has power over other men or moral power over another without a mutual act of will. Failure to understand or recognize this would lead to conflict.

Variations 
Iusnaturalism has different variations and these are based on religious and rational perspectives. Two of the most important are classical iusnaturalism and rationalist iusnaturalism. Classical iusnaturalism is associated with theorists such as Saint Thomas Aquinas, who maintained in his Treatise on Law that the universal laws of justice have a divine origin. Aquinas' conceptualization was an offshoot of his development of Aristotle's practical reasoning. David Hume opposed classical iusnaturalism with his "naturalistic fallacy" criticism.    

Rationalist or realist iusnaturalism emerged during the seventeenth and eighteenth centuries as a consequence of the process of secularization, which affected the relationship between Christianity and international law. Thinkers such as Grotius, Hobbes, and Kant maintain that the shared laws of justice are not revealed by God to humans but can be accessed by reason through an understanding of human nature. This type of iusnaturalism integrates natural law and positive law as species of the same genus since they share one principle of common validity - political power. There is also the case of the "iusnaturalist essentialism", which is a rationalist variant developed by Francisco Suarez. The Spanish theologian maintained that the source of law is divine will rather than divine reasoning. It was criticized for corrupting the structure of Aquinas' conceptualization. 

Moderate iusnaturalism is also another variant, which emphasizes how natural law exists together with positive law within a legal dualism that rejects all monisms as well as the so-called extreme iusnaturalism. The extreme type holds that "natural law exists and all that exists is natural law". It also recognizes that morality is one of the traits for characterizing what law is.

See also
Natural law
Treatise on Law

References 

Philosophy of law
Natural law
Thomistic jurisprudence
Theories of law